Melvyn "Deacon" Jones (December 12, 1943 – July 6, 2017) was a trumpet player and an organist and founding member of Baby Huey & the Babysitters.

Biography

In 1963 along with Johnny Ross and Jimmy Ramey, Jones formed Baby Huey & the Babysitters who went on to become a well known live attraction in Chicago. After Ramey's death in 1970 Jones embarked on a career that would see him work with Curtis Mayfield, Freddie King, and John Lee Hooker. During his career he worked with many noted musicians, including Gregg Allman, Elvin Bishop, Lester Chambers, Albert Collins, Pappo, and Buddy Miles. His brother is the drummer Harold Jones. He is survived by his son, Jason Christopher Jones and daughter Sarah Lee Grace Jones. In 2008 his autobiography The Blues Man - 40 Years with the Blues Legends was published.

1990s onwards
In 1992, the Bay Area Blues Society and the South Bay Blues Awards named Jones, "Keyboard Player of the Year".

In 2008, Jones published his autobiography, The Blues Man: 40 Years with the Blues Legends.

Death
Jones died on July 6, 2017 at the age of 73 in Hollywood, California.

Discography
 Let's Talk About The Blues (Blue Rock'it Records, 1987 – LP #107)
 Let's Talk About The Blues (Nile Lotus Productions, 2002 – CD) UPC: 634479396724
 Let's Talk About The Blues (D7 Sounds LLC, 2015 – worldwide digital release)
 Makin' Blues History - Vol. 1 (BDC Records, 1997 – CD)
 Makin Blues History (Nile Lotus Productions, 2002 – CD) UPC: 634479396823
 Makin' Blues History (D7 Sounds LLC, 2015 – worldwide digital release)
 Jonesen For Money (Nile Lotus Productions, 2002 – CD) UPC: 634479405426
 Jonesin' For Money (Kent Music/Kent Entertainment Group, 2006 – CD) UPC: 754387884523
 Jonesin' For Money (D7 Sounds LLC, 2015 – worldwide digital release)
With John Lee Hooker
Jealous (album) (Pausa, 1984 [1986])
With Pappo
Pappo With Deacon Jones – July 93 Los Angeles (Los Angeles, 1993)

References

External links
 Deacon Jones Blues Band Website
 Deacon Jones Record Label
 The Recordings of John Lee Hooker since 1981, (many featuring Deacon Jones)
 Curtis Mayfield and the Black Rock Connection

1943 births
2017 deaths
American male organists
Musicians from Richmond, Indiana
20th-century American keyboardists
20th-century American male musicians
American organists